James Ryan Clabots (born November 12, 1980), best known as Jimmy Clabots, is an American physical therapist, actor, and screenwriter. In 2009 he became a male escort, and retired in 2012. Since 2014 he’s been working as a writer and physical therapist  in Los Angeles.

Career
In 2000 he became a model. In 2008 Clabots started his career as an actor in the comedy film Another Gay Sequel: Gays Gone Wild!. In 2011 he starred in Showtime's Gigolos, showing male escorts in Las Vegas, but left the show in 2012 when he retired from escorting.

Personal life
Clabots is of Cuban and Spanish descent.

Filmography

Film

Television

References

External links
 
  ModelMayhem

1980 births
Living people
American male film actors
American male television actors
American male models
American people of Cuban descent
American people of Spanish descent
Place of birth missing (living people)